The 1957 Montana Grizzlies football team represented the University of Montana in the 1957 NCAA University Division football season as a member of the Skyline Conference. The Grizzlies were led by third-year head coach Jerry Williams, played their home games on campus at Dornblaser Field, and finished the season with a record of two wins and seven losses (2–7, 2–5 Skyline, seventh).

Schedule

References

External links
1957 Grizzly Football Yearbook

Montana
Montana Grizzlies football seasons
Montana Grizzlies football